Big Blue Ball is an album by multiple artists which "grew from 3 recording weeks" at Peter Gabriel's Real World Studios in the summers of 1991, 1992, and 1995. It is Peter Gabriel's fourteenth album project overall.

In production for more than 18 years, "Big Blue Ball" is a project featuring several artists from all around the world working together. Gabriel said that although the initial recording was finished by 1995, "the tapes were left in a mess and it's taken this long to sort out." Producer Stephen Hague was finally called in to sort out the project.

Guests on the album include Wendy Melvoin of Wendy & Lisa, Sinéad O'Connor, Karl Wallinger (of World Party), Natacha Atlas, and Papa Wemba. Gabriel takes the lead vocals on several tracks on the album. A mix of western, African, and Asian musicians are also included.

Big Blue Ball was launched in the United States in June, 24th, 2008. The European premiere took place 13 days previously on June, 11th, 2008 in the city of Aachen, Germany. "After all these years, it's a fine wine ready to be drunk," says Peter Gabriel, "It was the most fun music making I've ever had." It was released thanks to a venture-capital trust initiative.  Bosses at London-based firm Ingenious raised more than $4 million (£2 million) to help promote the release in the US. The venture capitalists, Gabriel, and his Real World Limited partners, created a new joint venture company, High Level Recordings Limited, to oversee the release of the album. The new album deal covers the North America territory, where Gabriel is currently out of contract. The worldwide distribution of the album will be dealt by Proper Music Distribution.

The first track released from the project was "Whole Thing", included on the soundtrack album for the TV series Long Way Down. A version of "Burn You Up, Burn You Down" was also included on Gabriel's 2003 compilation album Hit, with a radio edit released as a single.

There are two CD editions of the album with different covers; the music is the same on both.

A limited edition of 1000 copies of the album was released on blue vinyl, from Rykodisc.

The digital download versions of the album contain different bonus content depending on the country. UK download stores include the track "Whole Thing (Adrian Sherwood & Jazzwad Remix)". US download stores include the track "Habibe (Stefan Goodchild Remix)" and a digital booklet. Both versions include the "Story of the Big Blue Ball, Pt. 1" video.

Track listing

Personnel 
Produced by Peter Gabriel, Steven Hague and Karl Wallinger. Original recordings produced by Peter Gabriel and Karl Wallinger except "Altus silva" by Eric Mouquet and Michel Sanchez. Mixed by Tchad Blake except "Habibe" by Stephen Hague and "Everything Comes From You" by Richard Chappell.

 1. Whole Thing (Original Mix)
 Lead vocal, keyboards: Peter Gabriel
 Guitars: Karl Wallinger, Paul Allen
 Nord brass, backing vocals: Alex Faku
 Flutes: Francis Bebey
 Backing vocals: Tim Finn, Andy White
 Programming: Chuck Norman
 Toms: Tchad Blake
Published by Gallo Music Publishers/Mushroom Music Pty/Real World Music Ltd/WOMAD Music Ltd/Universal Music Publishing/Reverb Music Ltd

 2. Habibe
 Vocals: Natacha Atlas
 Drums & percussion: Hossam Ramzy, Neil Sparkes
 Strings: The Hossam Ramzy Egyptian Ensemble (Wael Abu Bakr, Adel Eskander, Momtaz Talaat)
 Saz: Tim Whelan
 Keyboards: Stephen Hague
 Programming: Chuck Norman
Published by Annie Reed Music/Hossam Ramzy PRS, MCPS & PAMRA/copyright control/Real World Music Ltd

 3. Shadow
 Vocals: Papa Wemba
 Backing Vocals: Reddy Amisi
 Guitar: Juan Manuel Cañizares
 Percussion: The Papa Wemba Band, Alan Gyorffy
 Bongos: Laurent Coatalen
 Frame Drums: Tchad Blake
Published by JMC Music Productions S.L./Real World Music Ltd/Universal Music Publishing/Real World Works Ltd

 4. Altus silva
 Vocals: Joseph Arthur, Iarla Ó Lionáird
 Bass: Noel Ekwabi
 Conga: The Papa Wemba Band
 Piano, keyboards: Eric Mouquet and Michel Sanchez
 Guitar synth: Vernon Reid
 Whistle, low whistle: James McNally
 Uilleann pipes: Ronan Browne
 Programming: Chuck Norman
 Keyboards, harmonium and flute like body bells: Tchad Blake
Published by Real World Music Ltd/ WOMAD Music Ltd/Editions La Paya (Catalogue YEAA Music)/Michel Sanchez Music (MSM)

 5. Exit Through You
 Vocals: Joseph Arthur, Peter Gabriel
 Guitar: Joseph Arthur, Karl Wallinger
 Bass: Peter Gabriel
 Keyboards: Peter Gabriel
 Backing Vocals: Justin Adams, Karl Wallinger
 Programming: Chuck Norman
 Shaker, tambourine, bass: Tchad Blake
Published by Real World Music Ltd

 6. Everything Comes From You
 Vocals: Sinead O’Connor
 Backing vocals: Sevara Nazarkhan
 Drums, percussion, Chinese drum: Joji Hirota
 Drums: Ged Lynch
 Flutes: Guo Yue
 Keyboards: Rupert Hine
 Piano: Angie Pollock
 Guitar, mandolin and recorder: Richard Evans
Published by WOMAD Music Ltd/EMI Music Publishing

 7. Burn You Up, Burn You Down
 Vocals, keyboards: Peter Gabriel
 Backing vocals: The Holmes Brothers: Wendell, Sherman & Popsi; Jules Shear; Karl Wallinger
 Guitar: Justin Adams, David Rhodes
 Bass: Jah Wobble, Wendy Melvoin
 Djembe, sabar: Arona N’Diaye
 Drums: Billy Cobham
 Programming: Chuck Norman
 Guitar synth, organ, skin shake, hi hat, frame drum: Tchad Blake
Published by Real World Music/Universal Publishing Ltd

 8. Forest
 Vocals: Hukwe Zawose
 Guitar: Vernon Reid
 Percussion: Arona N’Diaye
 Doudouk: Levon Minassian
 Programming: Chuck Norman and Stephen Hague
Published by Explorians/Copyright Control/WOMAD Music Ltd

 9. Rivers
 Lead vocal, flute: Marta Sebestyen
 Bass: Karl Wallinger
 Drones, river pad, general programming: Chuck Norman
 Guitar synth: Vernon Reid
 Accordion: Stephen Hague
 Drones: Peter Gabriel
Published by Kismet Bt.

 10. Jijy
 Vocals: Rossy
 Programming: Chuck Norman and Stephen Hague
 Percussion: Arona N’Diaye
 Drums and Vibes: Alan Gyorffy
 Bass: Jah Wobble
Published by Real World Music Ltd/Heaven Music PRS MCPS/Universal Music Publishing/Copyright Control

 11. Big Blue Ball
 Vocals, acoustic guitar, bass, keyboards: Karl Wallinger
 Piano, organ, keyboards, solo keyboards: Peter Gabriel
 Drums: Manu Katché
 Accordion: Stephen Hague
 Programming: Chuck Norman
 Kick drum, bells: Tchad Blake
Published by Universal Music Publishing

References and notes

External links 
 Big Blue Ball — official site at Real World Records
 NPR's "Weekend Edition Sunday" — interview with Peter Gabriel, Stephen Hague and Karl Wallinger

2008 albums
Albums produced by Peter Gabriel
Albums produced by Stephen Hague
Real World Records albums